DAPT may refer to:

 Dual antiplatelet therapy, a preventative treatment against heart attack and stroke
 Domestic asset-protection trust, a financial arrangement available in some jurisdictions to protect assets from being squandered
 DAPT (chemical), a research ligand used to inhibit the Notch signaling pathway